Olander or Ölander is a Swedish surname. Notable people with the surname include:

Arne Ölander (1902-1984), Swedish chemist
Cliff Olander (born 1955), American football player
Emelie Ölander (born 1989), Swedish international female football player
Jere Ölander (born 1989), Finnish professional ice hockey defender
Jim Olander (born 1963), American Major League Baseball player
Jimmy Olander (born 1961), American guitarist and banjo player for the American band Diamond Rio
Joan Lucille Olander (born 1931), birthname of American film actress Mamie Van Doren
Mårten Olander (born 1971), Swedish professional golfer
Mikael Olander (born 1963), Swedish decathlete and former Olympic competitor
Milton Olander, (1899–1961), American football player and coach
Rolf Olander (born 1934), Swedish Olympic swimmer
Ronny Olander (born 1949), Swedish politician
Tom Ölander (1954-2002), Finnish pioneer in fandom culture

See also
Marcus Falk-Olander (born 1987), Swedish footballer
Elsi Hetemäki-Olander (born 1927), Finnish politician
Maaren Olander-Doyle (born 1975), Estonian footballer

Swedish-language surnames